Shulgi ( dŠulgi, formerly read as Dungi) of Ur was the second king of the Third Dynasty of Ur. He reigned for 48 years, from c. 2094 – c. 2046 BC (Middle Chronology) or possibly c. 2030 – 1982 BC (Short Chronology). His accomplishments include the completion of construction of the Great Ziggurat of Ur, begun by his father Ur-Nammu. On his inscriptions, he took the titles "King of Ur", "King of Sumer and Akkad" and "King of the four corners of the universe". He used the symbol for divinity before his name, marking his apotheosis, from the 23rd year of his reign.

Life and work
Shulgi was the son of Ur-Nammu king of Ur and his queen consort Watartum. Year-names are known for all 48 years of his reign, providing a fairly complete contemporary view of the highlights of his career.

Shulgi is best known for his extensive revision of the scribal school's curriculum. Although it is unclear how much he actually wrote, there are numerous praise poems written by and directed towards this ruler. He proclaimed himself a god in his 23rd regnal year.

Some early chronicles castigate Shulgi for his impiety: The Weidner Chronicle (ABC 19) states that "he did not perform his rites to the letter, he defiled his purification rituals". CM 48 charges him with improper tampering with the rites, composing "untruthful stelae, insolent writings" on them. The Chronicle of Early Kings (ABC 20) accuses him of "criminal tendencies, and the property of Esagila and Babylon he took away as booty."

Name
Early uncertainties about the reading of cuneiform led to the readings "Shulgi" and "Dungi" being common transliterations before the end of the 19th century. However, over the course of the 20th century, the scholarly consensus gravitated away from dun towards shul as the correct pronunciation of the  sign. The spelling of Shulgi's name by scribes with the diĝir determinative reflects his deification during his reign, a status and spelling previously claimed by his Akkadian predecessor Naram-Sin.

Personal glorification

Shulgi also boasted about his ability to maintain high speeds while running long distances. He claimed in his 7th regnal year to have run from Nippur to Ur, a distance of not less than 100 miles. Kramer refers to Shulgi as "The first long distance running champion."

Shulgi wrote a long royal hymn to glorify himself and his actions, in which he refers to himself as "the king of the four-quarters, the pastor of the black-headed people".

Shulgi claimed that he spoke Elamite as well as he spoke Sumerian.

Armed conflicts
While Der had been one of the cities whose temple affairs Shulgi had directed in the first part of his reign, in his 20th year he claimed that the gods had decided that it now be destroyed, apparently as some punishment. The inscriptions state that he "put its field accounts in order" with the pick-axe. His 18th year-name was Year Liwir-mitashu, the king's daughter, was elevated to the ladyship in Marhashi, referring to a country east of Elam and her dynastic marriage to its king, Libanukshabash. Following this, Shulgi engaged in a period of expansionism at the expense of highlanders such as the Lullubi, and destroyed Simurrum (another mountain tribe) and Lulubum nine times between the 26th and 45th years of his reign. In his 30th year, his daughter was married to the governor of Anshan; in his 34th year, he was already levying a punitive campaign against the place. He also destroyed Kimash and Humurtu (cities to the east of Ur, somewhere in Elam) in the 45th year of his reign. Ultimately, Shulgi was never able to rule any of these distant peoples; at one point, in his 37th year, he was obliged to build a large wall in an attempt to keep them out.

Susa

Shulgi is known to have made dedications at Susa, as foundation nails with his name, dedicated to god Inshushinak have been found there. One of the votive foundation nails reads: "The god 'Lord of Susa,' his king, Shulgi, the mighty male, king of Ur, king of Sumer and Akkad, the..., his beloved temple, built.". An etched carnelian bead, now located in the Louvre Museum (Sb 6627) and inscribed with a dedication by Shulgi was also found in Susa, the inscription reading: "Ningal, his mother, Shulgi, god of his land, King of Ur, King of the four world quarters, for his life dedicated (this)".

The Ur III dynasty had held control over Susa since the demise of Puzur-Inshushinak, and they built numerous buildings and temples there. This control was continued by Shulgi as shown by his numerous dedications in the city-state. He also engaged in marital alliances, by marrying his daughters to rulers of eastern territories, such as Anšan, Marhashi and Bashime.

Modernization
Shulgi apparently led a major modernization of the Third Dynasty of Ur. He improved communications, reorganized the army, reformed the writing system and weight and measures, unified the tax system and created a strong bureaucracy. He also promulgated the law code known as the Code of Ur-Nammu after his father.

Year names

There are extensive remains for the year names of Shulgi, which have been entirely reconstructed from year 1 to year 48. Some of the most important are:

Marriage with a princess from Mari and other royal women
Shulgi was a contemporary of the Shakkanakku rulers of Mari, particularly Apil-kin and Iddi-ilum. An inscription mentions that Taram-Uram, the daughter of Apil-kin, became the "daughter-in-law" of Ur-Nammu, and therefore the Queen of king Shulgi. In the inscription, she called herself "daughter-in-law of Ur-Nammu", and "daughter of Apil-kin, Lugal ("King") of Mari", suggesting for Apil-kin a position as a supreme ruler, and pointing to a marital alliance between Mari and Ur.

Nin-kalla was a queen at the end of the king's reign. Many texts show that she was running the palace in Nippur.
Another important royal woman, but not a queen, was Ea-niša. She appears in many texts and had an influential position at the royal court, perhaps as concubine. A similar status had Shulgi-simti who is known from a high number of texts presenting evidence for her economic power. Another important woman was Geme-Ninlilla who appears in texts at the end of the king's reign. Other, less well known royal women are Šuqurtum and Simat-Ea.

Shulgi is known to have had five sons, Amar-dDa-mu, Lu-dNanna, Lugal-a-zi-da, Ur-dSuen, Amar-Sin as well as one daughter, Peš-tur-tur.

Artifacts and inscriptions

See also

Correspondence of the Kings of Ur
History of Sumer
Sumerian king list
Self-praise of Shulgi

References

External links

Shulgi's axe sold illegally in Germany from the German Middle East magazine zenith
The face of Shulgi. A realistic statue shows us how Shulgi may have looked in real life.

|-

Sumerian kings
21st-century BC Sumerian kings
20th-century BC Sumerian kings
Deified people
Third Dynasty of Ur